Honywood is an English-language surname. This list provides links to biographies of people who share this surname.

Notable people with the surname include:

Military officers
 Sir Philip Honywood (c. 1677 – 1752), British Army officer
 Philip Honywood (British Army officer, died 1785) (c. 1710 − 1785) British Army officer and Member of Parliament

Parliamentarians
 Christopher Honywood (died 1599), Member of Parliament of England for Hythe constituency
 Filmer Honywood (c. 1745 − 2 June 1809), MP for Canterbury
 John Honywood (MP for Hythe), in 1504 and 1510, Member of Parliament of England for Hythe constituency
 Sir John Honywood, 4th Baronet, MP for Canterbury, Honiton and Steyning
 John Lamotte Honywood (1647–1694), MP for Essex
 Robert Honywood (New Romney MP) (1601–1686), MP for New Romney
 Robert Honywood (Essex MP) (died 1735), MP for Essex
 Thomas Honywood (Hythe MP) (died 1580), Member of Parliament of England for Hythe constituency
 Sir Thomas Honywood MP (1586–1666), of Marks Hall in Essex
 Sir William Honywood, 2nd Baronet (c.1654 – 1748), MP for Canterbury
 William Honywood (died 1818) (c.1759 – 1818), MP for Kent
 William Philip Honywood (1790–1831), MP for Kent

Others
 Mary Honywood (1527–1620), British heiress and supporter of persecuted Protestants; matriarch who lived to see over 360 of her descendants
 Michael Honywood (1597–1681), Dean of Lincoln and grandson of Mary Honywood
 Robert Honywood (cricketer) (1825–1870), of Marks Hall in Essex, son of William Philip Honywood, cricketer
 Samuel Honywood, actor (born 1996)
 Captain Thomas Honywood (1819−1888), English archaeologist and photographer

See also
 Honeywood
 Honywood baronets
 Honywood Community Science School, named after the Honywood family of Marks Hall
 Filmer baronets
 Henry Honywood Dombrain (1818–1905), British botanist, mycologist and cleric